Young and Restless is the fourth studio album by Canadian rock band Prism, released in 	May 1980 by Capitol Records. The album is notably the band's last studio album to feature lead vocalist Ron Tabak, and it is also the last album to feature their long-time producer, Bruce Fairbairn.

The album was viewed negatively by the majority of music critics. It was also a commercial disappointment, being their first album failing to chart on the Billboard 200. However, in 1980, Young and Restless did achieve Platinum status in Canada (in excess of 100,000 copies sold).

Critical reception
In a retrospective review for AllMusic, critic Mike DeGagne wrote of the album "The solid instrumental sound and confident songwriting that they produced on their last recording have somehow disappeared, and even John Hall's synthesizers can't muster any redemption amongst the album's filler. Young & Restless showed signs of the band declining in all aspects, which was later confirmed on Prism's future releases."

Track listing
Side one
"American Music" (Lindsay Mitchell) – 3:59
"Young and Restless" (Al Harlow, Mitchell) – 3:25
"Satellite" (Harlow, Mitchell) – 3:36
"Party Line" (Mitchell) – 3:08
"Acid Rain" (Mitchell) – 4:35

Side two
"Another World" (Harlow, Mitchell) – 4:22
"The Visitor" (Mitchell) – 2:02
"Deception" (Harlow) – 3:36
"Hideaway" (Harlow) – 3:52
"Runnin' for Cover" (Rocket Norton, Timothy McHugh) – 3:38

Renaissance Records bonus tracks (2019)
"Cover Girl"
"See Forever Eyes (live)"
"Spaceship Superstar (live)"
"Take Me to the Kaptin (live)"
"Flyin' (live)"

Personnel
Credits are adapted from the Young and Restless liner notes.

Prism
 Ron Tabak — lead vocals
 John Hall — keyboards
 Lindsay Mitchell — guitars, backing vocals
 Rocket Norton — drums
 Al Harlow — bass guitar, guitars, backing vocals

Additional musician
 Bruce Fairbairn — horn section

Production
 Bruce Fairbairn — producer
 Prism — producer
 Bob Rock — engineer
 Mike Fraser — engineer
 Doug Grover — engineer

References

 https://musiccanada.com/gold-platinum/?_paged=791

External links

1980 albums
Prism (band) albums
Albums produced by Bruce Fairbairn
Capitol Records albums